The year 1950 in film involved some significant events.


Top-grossing films (U.S.)

The top ten 1950 released films by box office gross in North America are as follows:

Events
 January 13 – Three weeks after its world premiere at the Paramount and Rivoli theatres in New York City, Cecil B. DeMille's Samson and Delilah opens in Los Angeles. The film is a massive commercial success and wins the awards for Best Art Direction and Best Costume Design at the 23rd Academy Awards.
 February 15 – Walt Disney Studios' animated film Cinderella debuts. The film is the most successful the studio has made since Dumbo, and saves the studio from four million dollars in debt. 
 July 19 – Walt Disney Studios' first completely live-action film Treasure Island debuts.

Awards

Top ten money making stars

Notable films released in 1950
US unless stated

#

47 morto che parla, starring Totò – (Italy)
711 Ocean Drive, starring Edmond O'Brien and Joanne Dru

A
Abbott and Costello in the Foreign Legion, starring Bud Abbott and Lou Costello
The Admiral Was a Lady, starring Wanda Hendrix and Edmond O'Brien
All About Eve, directed by Joseph L. Mankiewicz, starring Bette Davis, Anne Baxter,  George Sanders, Celeste Holm, Hugh Marlowe, Marilyn Monroe – winner of 6 Oscars
Ambush, starring Robert Taylor and Arlene Dahl
Annie Get Your Gun, starring Betty Hutton, Howard Keel, Louis Calhern
Armored Car Robbery, starring Charles McGraw and William Talman
The Asphalt Jungle, directed by John Huston, starring Sterling Hayden, Louis Calhern, Sam Jaffe, James Whitmore, Jean Hagen and Marilyn Monroe
The Astonished Heart, starring Celia Johnson and Noël Coward – (GB)
At War with the Army, starring Dean Martin and Jerry Lewis

B
Babul (Father's House), starring Dilip Kumar and Nargis – (India)
Backfire, starring Virginia Mayo and Gordon MacRae
The Bandit Queen, starring Barbara Britton and Phillip Reed
The Baron of Arizona, starring Vincent Price
Beauty and the Devil (La Beauté du diable), directed by René Clair, starring Michel Simon – (France/Italy)
Beqasoor, starring Madhubala – (India)
The Big Lift, starring Montgomery Clift and Paul Douglas
Bitter Springs, starring Tommy Trinder and Chips Rafferty – (Australia/GB)
The Black Forest Girl, starring Sonja Ziemann and Rudolf Prack –  (West Germany)
The Black Rose, starring Tyrone Power and Orson Welles – (GB/US)
The Blue Lamp, starring Jack Warner and Dirk Bogarde – (GB)
Born to Be Bad, starring Joan Fontaine and Robert Ryan
Born Yesterday, directed by George Cukor, starring Broderick Crawford, Judy Holliday and William Holden
The Breaking Point, directed by Michael Curtiz, starring John Garfield and Patricia Neal
Bright Leaf, starring Gary Cooper, Lauren Bacall and Patricia Neal
Broken Arrow, starring James Stewart and Jeff Chandler

C
Café Paradis – (Denmark)
Caged, starring Eleanor Parker
Caiçara, directed by and starring Adolfo Celi – (Brazil)
Captain Carey, U.S.A., starring Alan Ladd and Wanda Hendrix
Captain China, starring John Payne and Gail Russell
Champagne for Caesar, starring Ronald Colman, Celeste Holm,  Vincent Price, Art Linkletter
Cheaper by the Dozen, starring Clifton Webb and Myrna Loy
Cinderella, a Disney animated film. Directed by Clyde Geronimi, Hamilton Luske, and Wilfred Jackson, starring Ilene Woods, Eleanor Audley, Verna Felton, Rhoda Williams, James MacDonald, Luis van Rooten, Don Barclay, Mike Douglas, and Lucille Bliss
Comanche Territory, starring Maureen O'Hara
Convicted, starring Glenn Ford and Broderick Crawford
Crisis, starring Cary Grant and Jose Ferrer
Cyrano de Bergerac, starring José Ferrer

D
D.O.A., starring Edmond O'Brien
Dallas, starring Gary Cooper
The Damned Don't Cry, starring Joan Crawford
Dance Hall, directed by Charles Crichton, starring Diana Dors and Petula Clark – (GB)
Darah dan Doa, directed and produced by Usmar Ismail – (Indonesia), first native-produced Indonesian film
Dark City, directed by William Dieterle, starring Charlton Heston (in his first studio film), Lizabeth Scott, Viveca Lindfors, Dean Jagger, Mike Mazurki, Ed Begley
The Daughter of Rosie O'Grady, starring June Haver and Gordon MacRae
Death is a Caress (Døden er et kjærtegn) – (Norway)
Deported, starring Jeff Chandler
Destination Moon, starring John Archer
The Devil Is a Woman (Doña Diabla) – (Mexico)
Devil's Doorway, starring Robert Taylor, Louis Calhern, Paula Raymond
Dial 1119, starring Marshall Thompson, Virginia Field, William Conrad
Dieu a besoin des hommes (God Needs Man), directed by Jean Delannoy – (France)

E
The Eagle and the Hawk, starring Rhonda Fleming and John Payne
Edge of Doom, starring Farley Granger and Mala Powers
Les Enfants Terribles, directed by Jean-Pierre Melville – (France)
Escape at Dawn (Akatsuki no dasso) – (Japan)

F
The Fall of Berlin (Padeniye Berlina) – (USSR)
Fancy Pants, starring Bob Hope and Lucille Ball
Father Is a Bachelor, starring William Holden and Colleen Gray
Father of the Bride, directed by Vincente Minnelli, starring Spencer Tracy, Joan Bennett and Elizabeth Taylor
The File on Thelma Jordon, starring Barbara Stanwyck
The Fireball, starring Mickey Rooney and Pat O'Brien
The Flame and the Arrow, starring Burt Lancaster and Virginia Mayo
The Flowers of St. Francis (Francesco, giullare di Dio), directed by Roberto Rossellini – (Italy)
For Heaven's Sake, starring Clifton Webb and Joan Bennett
Frenchie, starring Joel McCrea and Shelley Winters
The Fuller Brush Girl, starring Lucille Ball and Eddie Albert
The Furies, directed by Anthony Mann, starring Barbara Stanwyck and Walter Huston

G
Gabriela, directed by Géza von Cziffra, starring Zarah Leander – (West Germany)
Gerald McBoing-Boing
The Glass Menagerie, based on the play by Tennessee Williams, starring Jane Wyman, Kirk Douglas, Gertrude Lawrence and Arthur Kennedy
Gone to Earth, starring Jennifer Jones – (GB)
 Guilty of Treason, starring Charles Bickford and Bonita Granville
Gun Crazy (aka Deadly is the Female), starring John Dall and Peggy Cummins
The Gunfighter, starring Gregory Peck
Gunman in the Streets, starring Simone Signoret – (France)

H
The Happiest Days of Your Life, starring Alastair Sim and Margaret Rutherford – (GB)
Harriet Craig, starring Joan Crawford and Wendell Corey
Harvey, starring James Stewart and Josephine Hull
 The High and the Mighty, starring John Wayne and Claire Trevor
Highly Dangerous, starring Margaret Lockwood and Dane Clark – (GB)
Highway 301, starring Steve Cochran and Virginia Grey
The Hollywood Ten, documentary by John Berry
House by the River, starring Louis Hayward and Jane Wyatt
Hunt the Man Down, starring Gig Young and Carla Balenda

I
The Iroquois Trail, starring George Montgomery
I Was a Shoplifter, starring Scott Brady and Mona Freeman
I'll Get By, starring June Haver, Gloria DeHaven, Steve Allen, Dennis Day
In a Lonely Place, directed by Nicholas Ray, starring Humphrey Bogart and Gloria Grahame

J
The Jackie Robinson Story, starring Robinson as himself, with Ruby Dee
Jogan, starring Dilip Kumar and Nargis – (India)
Johnny One-Eye, starring Pat O'Brien
Julius Caesar, starring Charlton Heston
Justice is Done (Justice est faite) – (France)

K
Key to the City, starring Clark Gable and Loretta Young
The Kid (Xi lu xiang), starring 10-year-old Bruce Lee – (Hong Kong)
Kill the Umpire, starring William Bendix, William Frawley, Una Merkel
The Killer That Stalked New York, starring Evelyn Keyes
Kim, starring Errol Flynn
King Solomon's Mines, starring Deborah Kerr and Stewart Granger
Kiss Tomorrow Goodbye, starring James Cagney

L
A Lady Without Passport, starring Hedy Lamarr and John Hodiak
Last Holiday, starring Alec Guinness – (GB)
The Lawless, directed by Joseph Losey, starring Macdonald Carey
Let's Dance, starring Fred Astaire and Betty Hutton
Life (Jeevitham), directed by A. V. Meiyappan, starring Vyjayanthimala in her Telugu film debut – (India)
A Life of Her Own, starring Lana Turner and Ray Milland
The Life of Wu Xun (Wu Xun zhuan) – (China)
Louisa, starring Ronald Reagan
Love Happy, starring the Marx Brothers and, in a non-speaking role, Marilyn Monroe

M
The Magnificent Yankee, starring Louis Calhern
The Man Who Cheated Himself, starring Lee J. Cobb and Jane Wyatt
The Men, starring Marlon Brando in his film debut, with Teresa Wright, Everett Sloane, Jack Webb and, in a bit part, DeForest Kelley
The Miniver Story, starring Greer Garson, Walter Pidgeon and John Hodiak
Mirror of Holland (Spiegel van Holland) – (Netherlands) winner of Short Film Palme d'Or
Mister 880, starring Burt Lancaster and Edmund Gwenn
Montana, starring Errol Flynn and Alexis Smith
Morning Departure (aka Operation Disaster), starring John Mills and Richard Attenborough – (GB)
Mrs. O'Malley and Mr. Malone, starring Marjorie Main and James Whitmore
The Mudlark, starring Irene Dunne and Alec Guinness – (GB/US)
Mussorgsky – (USSR)
My Blue Heaven, starring Betty Grable
My Friend Irma Goes West, starring Dean Martin and Jerry Lewis
Mystery Street, starring Ricardo Montalbán

N
Nancy Goes to Rio, starring Ann Sothern, Jane Powell, Barry Sullivan, Carmen Miranda, Louis Calhern, and Scotty Beckett
The Nevadan, starring Randolph Scott and Dorothy Malone
Night and the City, directed by Jules Dassin, starring Richard Widmark and Gene Tierney – (GB)
No Man of Her Own, starring Barbara Stanwyck
No Peace Under the Olive Tree (Non c'è pace tra gli ulivi), starring Raf Vallone – (Italy)
No Way Out, starring Richard Widmark, Linda Darnell, Stephen McNally and Sidney Poitier

O
Odette, starring Anna Neagle and Trevor Howard – (GB)
Los Olvidados, directed by Luis Buñuel – photograph of Gabriel Figueroa – (Mexico)
Once a Thief, starring Cesar Romero and Lon Chaney, Jr.
One Way Street, starring James Mason
Orphée, directed by Jean Cocteau, starring Jean Marais – (France)
Outrage, directed by Ida Lupino, starring Mala Powers
Outside the Wall, starring Richard Basehart and Marilyn Maxwell

P
Panic in the Streets, directed by Elia Kazan, starring Richard Widmark, Jack Palance, Zero Mostel and Barbara Bel Geddes
Path of Hope (Il Cammino della speranza), directed by Pietro Germi, starring Raf Vallone – (Italy)
Perfect Strangers, starring Ginger Rogers
Please Believe Me, starring Deborah Kerr, Peter Lawford and Robert Walker 
Post Office Box 1001 (Apartado de correos 1001) – (Spain)
Prehistoric Women, directed by Gregg C. Tallas
Prima comunione (aka Father's Dilemma), starring Aldo Fabrizi – (Italy)

Q
Quicksand, starring Mickey Rooney and Peter Lorre

R
Rashomon, directed by Akira Kurosawa, starring Toshiro Mifune and Masayuki Mori – (Japan)
Riding High, directed by Frank Capra, starring Bing Crosby
Right Cross, starring June Allyson and Dick Powell
Rio Grande, directed by John Ford, starring John Wayne and Maureen O'Hara
Rocketship X-M, starring Lloyd Bridges, Hugh O'Brian and Noah Beery, Jr.
Rocky Mountain, starring Errol Flynn and Patrice Wymore
Rogues of Sherwood Forest, starring John Derek
La Ronde (The Merry-Go-Round), directed by Max Ophüls, starring Simone Signoret and Anton Walbrook – (France)
Room to Let, directed by Godfrey Grayson

S
Scandal (Sukyandaru), directed by Akira Kurosawa – (Japan)
The Second Face, starring Ella Raines
The Secret Fury, starring Claudette Colbert and Robert Ryan
September Affair, starring Joan Fontaine and Joseph Cotten
Seven Days to Noon, directed by the Boulting Brothers, starring Barry Jones – (GB)
Shadow on the Wall, starring Ann Sothern, Zachary Scott, Nancy Davis
Side Street, starring Farley Granger and Cathy O'Donnell
Sierra, starring Wanda Hendrix and Audie Murphy
The Sleeping City, starring Richard Conte
So Long at the Fair, starring Jean Simmons and Dirk Bogarde – (GB)
The Sound of Fury, starring Frank Lovejoy and Lloyd Bridges
Stage Fright, directed by Alfred Hitchcock, starring Jane Wyman, Marlene Dietrich, Michael Wilding and Richard Todd – (GB)
Stars in My Crown, starring Joel McCrea
State Secret, starring Douglas Fairbanks Jr. and Jack Hawkins – (GB)
Story of a Love Affair (Cronaca di un amore), directed by Michelangelo Antonioni – (Italy)
Stromboli, directed by Roberto Rossellini, starring Ingrid Bergman – (Italy/US)
Summer Stock, starring Judy Garland and Gene Kelly, with Phil Silvers
Sunday in August (Domenica d'agosto) – (Italy)
Sunset Boulevard, directed by Billy Wilder, starring William Holden, Gloria Swanson, Erich Von Stroheim, Nancy Olson

T
También de Dolor se Canta (They Also Sing from Sadness), starring Pedro Infante – (Mexico)
Tea for Two, starring Doris Day and Gordon MacRae
Tension, starring Richard Basehart and Audrey Totter
This Life of Mine (Wo zhe yi bei zi) – (China)
Three Came Home, starring Claudette Colbert
Three Little Words, starring Fred Astaire and Red Skelton
Three Secrets, starring Eleanor Parker, Patricia Neal, Ruth Roman
A Ticket to Tomahawk, starring Anne Baxter and Dan Dailey
The Titan: Story of Michelangelo, award-winning documentary by Robert J. Flaherty
To Joy (Till glädje), directed by Ingmar Bergman – (Sweden)
To Please a Lady, starring Clark Gable and Barbara Stanwyck
The Toast of New Orleans, starring Kathryn Grayson and Mario Lanza
Tomorrow Is Too Late (Domani è troppo tardi), starring Pier Angeli and Vittorio De Sica – (Italy)
The Trap (Past), directed by Martin Frič – (Czechoslovakia)
Treasure Island, starring Robert Newton – (GB/US)
Trio, starring Nigel Patrick, Wilfred Hyde-White, Jean Simmons – (GB)
Tripoli, starring Maureen O'Hara and John Payne
Two Flags West, starring Joseph Cotten and Linda Darnell
Two Weeks with Love, starring Jane Powell and Ricardo Montalbán

U
El último caballo (The Last Horse) – (Spain)
The Underworld Story, starring Dan Duryea
Union Station, starring William Holden
Until We Meet Again (Mata au hi made) – (Japan)

V
Variety Lights (Luci del varietà), directed by Federico Fellini – (Italy)
Vendetta, starring Faith Domergue (filmed in 1946 but not released until 1950 due to delays from Howard Hughes)
Virtue for Sale, directed by Mahmoud Zulfikar, starring Mahmoud Zulfikar, Faten Hamama – (Egypt)

W
Wabash Avenue, starring Betty Grable (a remake of Grable's 1943 film Coney Island)
Wagon Master, directed by John Ford, starring Ben Johnson, Joanne Dru and Ward Bond
Watch the Birdie, starring Red Skelton, Arlene Dahl and Ann Miller
The West Point Story, starring James Cagney and Doris Day
When Willie Comes Marching Home, starring Dan Dailey
Where Danger Lives, starring Robert Mitchum and Faith Domergue in her film debut
Where the Sidewalk Ends, directed by Otto Preminger, starring Dana Andrews and Gene Tierney
Winchester '73, starring James Stewart, Shelley Winters, Stephen McNally, Dan Duryea, and with early appearances by Rock Hudson and Tony Curtis
The Woman in Question, directed by Anthony Asquith, starring Jean Kent and Dirk Bogarde – (GB)
Woman in Hiding, starring Ida Lupino, Howard Duff and Stephen McNally
Woman on the Run, starring Ann Sheridan and Dennis O'Keefe
The Wooden Horse, starring Leo Genn and Anthony Steel – (GB)

Y
The Yellow Cab Man, starring Red Skelton and Gloria DeHaven
The Young and the Damned (Los Olvidados), directed by Luis Buñuel – (Mexico)
Young Man with a Horn, directed by Michael Curtiz, starring Kirk Douglas, Lauren Bacall, Doris Day

Z
Zhukovsky – (USSR)

Serials
Atom Man vs. Superman, starring Kirk Alyn, Noel Neill and Lyle Talbot
Cody of the Pony Express
Desperadoes of the West, starring Tom Keene
Flying Disc Man from Mars, starring Walter Reed and Lois Collier
The Invisible Monster, starring Richard Webb and Aline Towne

Pirates of the High Seas, starring Buster Crabbe

Short film series
Mickey Mouse (1928–1952)
Looney Tunes (1930–1969)
Merrie Melodies (1931–1969)
Popeye (1933–1957)
The Three Stooges (1934–1959)
Donald Duck (1936–1956)
Pluto (1937–1951)
Goofy (1939–1953)
Tom and Jerry (1940–1958)
Bugs Bunny (1940–1962)
The Fox and the Crow (1941–1950)
Mighty Mouse (1942–1955)
Chip and Dale (1943–1956)
Yosemite Sam (1945–1963)
Noveltoons (1943–1967)

Births
January 1 – Gerard McSorley, Irish actor
January 7 – Erin Gray, American model and actress
January 22 – Pamela Salem, British actress
January 24 – Daniel Auteuil, French actor
January 30 – Trinidad Silva, American comedian and character actor (d. 1988)
February 5 – Jonathan Freeman, American actor, voice actor, singer and puppeteer
February 12 – Michael Ironside, Canadian actor
February 17 – Prunella Gee, English actress
February 18 
John Hughes, American director, producer and screenwriter (d. 2009)
Cybill Shepherd, American actress
February 21 – Larry Drake, American actor and comedian (d. 2016)
February 22 – Julie Walters, English actress
February 23 – Mary Pat Gleason, American actress (d. 2020)
February 25 – Neil Jordan, Irish director
March 2 – Matthew Laurance, American actor and comedian
March 3 – Laura Ziskin, American producer (d. 2011)
March 11 – Jerry Zucker, American director and producer
March 13 – William H. Macy, American actor
March 18 – Brad Dourif, American actor
March 20
William Hurt, American actor (d. 2022)
Tom Towles, American character actor (d. 2015)
March 23 – Corinne Cléry, French actress
March 26 
Martin Short, Canadian comedian and actor
Alan Silvestri, American film composer and conductor
March 29 – Barry Pearl, American actor
March 30 – Robbie Coltrane, Scottish actor (d. 2022)
April 4 – Christine Lahti, American actress
April 12 – David Cassidy, American actor and singer-songwriter (d. 2017)
April 13 
Ron Perlman, American actor
William Sadler, American actor
April 15 – Josiane Balasko, French actress, writer and director
April 16 – David Graf, American actor (d. 2001)
April 22 – Thierry Zéno, Belgian director (d. 2017)
April 23 - Henry Goodman, British actor
April 28 – Jay Leno, American comedian, actor, writer, producer and late-night television host
April 29 – Phillip Noyce, Australian director
May 1 – John Diehl, American character actor
May 8 – Robert Mugge, American director and producer
May 9 – Marcheline Bertrand, American actress (d. 2007)
May 12 – Gabriel Byrne, Irish actor
May 13 – Joe Johnston, American director, writer and visual effects artist
May 15 – Nicholas Hammond, American-born Australian actor and writer
May 18
Gerry Mendicino, Canadian actor
Nick Wyman, American actor
May 22 – Peter Wildman, Canadian actor
June 1 – John M. Jackson, American film and television actor
June 5 – Daniel von Bargen, American character actor (d. 2015)
June 6 – Chantal Akerman, Belgian director (d. 2015)
June 8 – Kathy Baker, American actress
June 13 – Belinda Bauer, Australian actress
June 14 - Jeremy Sinden, English actor (d. 1996)
June 17 – Lee Tamahori, New Zealand filmmaker
June 19 – Daria Nicolodi, Italian actress and screenwriter (d. 2020)
June 24 – Nancy Allen, American actress
June 25 – Thomas Jefferson Byrd, American actor (d. 2020)
June 26 – Michael Paul Chan, American actor
July 17 – Barbara Rosenblat, British actress
July 20 – Tantoo Cardinal, Canadian actress
July 28 - Lani Minella, American voice actress, voice director and producer
July 29 – Mike Starr, American character actor
August 5 – Holly Palance, American actress
August 6 – Dorian Harewood, American actor
August 11
Elya Baskin, Latvian-American character actor
Adam LeFevre, American character actor
August 12 – Jim Beaver, American actor
August 13 – Jane Carr, English actress
August 14 – Peter Guinness (actor), English actor
August 16 - Marshall Manesh, Iranian-American actor
August 20 – Skip O'Brien, American actor (d. 2011)
August 27 – Charles Fleischer, American stand-up comedian, actor, writer and musician
September 7 – Julie Kavner, American film and television actress, voice actress and comedian
September 11 – Amy Madigan, American actress
September 12 – Bruce Mahler, American actor, producer and writer
September 14 – Howard Deutch, American director
September 21 – Bill Murray, American actor and comedian
September 24
Harriet Walter, British actress
Kristina Wayborn, Swedish actress
September 27 - Cary-Hiroyuki Tagawa, Japanese-born American actor, producer and martial artist
September 28 – John Sayles, American director and screenwriter
September 30 – Vondie Curtis-Hall, American actor, screenwriter and director
October 1 – Randy Quaid, American actor
October 2 – Ian McNeice, English actor
October 4 – Alan Rosenberg, American actor
October 5 – Jeff Conaway, American actor and singer (d. 2011)
October 17 – Howard Rollins, American actor (d. 1996)
October 18 – Om Puri, Indian actor (d. 2017)
October 31 – John Candy, Canadian comedian and actor (d. 1994)
November 13 – Jules Sylvester, British wild animal trainer, actor and television presenter
November 16 – David Leisure, American actor
November 18 – Eric Pierpoint, American actor
November 28 – Ed Harris, American actor
December 10 – Gregg Berger, American voice actor
December 12 – Duane Chase, American actor
December 13 – Wendie Malick, American-Canadian actress, previously fashion model
December 21
Jane How, English actress
Jeffrey Katzenberg, American filmmaker and animator
December 22 – Jeris Lee Poindexter, American actor, comedian and musician
December 29 - Jon Polito, American character actor (d. 2016)

Deaths
January 2 – Emil Jannings, 65, Swiss-born German actor, The Blue Angel, The Last Laugh
January 12 – John M. Stahl, 63, American film director and producer, Leave Her to Heaven, Imitation of Life
January 22
Alan Hale Sr., 57, American actor, director, The Adventures of Robin Hood, Santa Fe Trail
Corinne Luchaire, 28, French actress, Prison Without Bars, Conflict
March 10 – Marguerite De La Motte, 47, American actress, The Mark of Zorro, The Iron Mask
March 18 – Edgar Rice Burroughs, 74, American writer, creator of Tarzan
March 25 – Frank Buck, 66, American actor and animal expert, Bring 'Em Back Alive, Africa Screams
April 7 – Walter Huston, 67, American Academy Award-winning actor, The Treasure of the Sierra Madre, Dodsworth
April 26 – Hobart Cavanaugh, 63, American actor, I Cover the Waterfront, A Letter to Three Wives
May 1 – Ernst Laemmle, 49, German director and screenwriter, The Phantom of the Opera, The Palm Beach Story
June 22 – Jane Cowl, 66, American actress, No Man of Her Own, Payment on Demand
July 17 – Antonie Nedošinská, 65, Czech actress, Falešná kočička aneb Když si žena umíní, Capek's Tales
September 13 – Sara Allgood, 69, Irish actress, How Green Was My Valley, The Lodger
October 23 – Al Jolson, 64, Lithuanian-born American actor, singer, entertainer, The Jazz Singer, Rhapsody in Blue, The Singing Fool
October 29 – Maurice Costello, 73, American actor, Du Barry Was a Lady, Tin Pan Alley
December 4 – James Kevin McGuinness, 56, Irish-American producer and screenwriter, Madame X, Rio Grande
December 28 – William Garwood, 66, American silent-film actor and director, The Cowboy Millionaire, Proxy Husband

Film debuts
Marlon Brando – The Men
Carol Channing – Paid in Full
Richard Crenna – Let's Dance
Tippi Hedren – The Petty Girl
Piper Laurie – Louisa
Sophia Loren – Totò Tarzan
Rita Moreno – So Young, So Bad
Jack Palance – Panic in the Streets
Peter Sellers – The Black Rose
Robert Wagner – The Happy Years

References

 
Film by year